Pierre de La Gorce (19 June 1846, Vannes – 2 January 1934) was a French magistrate, lawyer and historian, as well as a member of the Académie française.  He wrote books about the Second French Republic, the Second French Empire and the French Revolution, as well as other topics.  He taught law of the Sorbonne.

References

1846 births
1934 deaths
19th-century French historians
19th-century French lawyers
Members of the Académie Française
French male non-fiction writers
20th-century French historians
Writers from Vannes